Salzhausen is a municipality in the district of Harburg, in Lower Saxony, Germany. It is situated approximately 40 km southeast of Hamburg, and 15 km west of Lüneburg.

Salzhausen is also the seat of the Samtgemeinde ("collective municipality") Salzhausen.

References

External links
 Official website

Harburg (district)